The women's javelin throw at the 1962 European Athletics Championships was held in Belgrade, then Yugoslavia, at JNA Stadium on 13 and 14 September 1962.

Medalists

Results

Final
14 September

Qualification
13 September

Participation
According to an unofficial count, 14 athletes from 11 countries participated in the event.

 (1)
 (1)
 (1)
 (2)
 (1)
 (1)
 (1)
 (3)
 (1)
 (1)
 (1)

References

Javelin throw
Javelin throw at the European Athletics Championships
Euro